Rachel or Rachael Newman may refer to:

J. W. and Rachel Newman House and Bunkhouse
Rachael Newman, protagonist in American Psycho 2
Rachel Newman, character in Mission Compromised
Rachel Newman (editor), editor emeritus of Country Living